Vortex is a 1981 film directed by Scott B and Beth B and starring James Russo and Lydia Lunch.

Premise
A detective searches her way through the plans of a corporate businessman who wants government defense contracts through real life corporate wars and manipulation of politicians.

References

External links

1981 films
American independent films
American detective films
Film noir
New Wave
Punk films
1980s English-language films
1980s American films